Lågøya is an island in Svalbard, Norway. It is situated north west of Nordaustlandet. The area is 103.5 km2. The island has rarely been visited.

Lågøya was first marked on the Muscovy Company's map (1625) as Purchas plus ultra Island. Cornelis Giles and Outger Rep (c. 1710) labeled it t' Lage eyl. The island was first marked Low Island by William Scoresby (1820).

References

Conway, W. M. 1906. No Man's Land: A History of Spitsbergen from Its Discovery in 1596 to the Beginning of the Scientific Exploration of the Country. Cambridge: At the University Press.
Norwegian Polar Institute Place names in Norwegian polar areas

See also
 List of islands of Norway

Islands of Svalbard